

The Westchester House (now the Sohotel New York) is a hotel on the Bowery at Broome Street in Manhattan, New York City. It was previously also known as the Occidental and the Pioneer. The building was added to the National Register of Historic Places on March 20, 1986. , the Sohotel has been fully renovated.

See also
National Register of Historic Places listings in Manhattan below 14th Street

References

External links
Harlow, A.F. Old Bowery Days: Chronicles of a Famous Street. (1931).
http://www.thing.net/~lina/oddends/hotel.html

Hotel buildings on the National Register of Historic Places in Manhattan
Lower East Side
Hotels in Manhattan
Nolita
Greek Revival architecture in New York City